Gergely Ghéczy (Chinese: 芝利·卡士; born 3 November 1980 in Hungary) is a former Hungarian professional footballer who played as a centre back.

References

Living people
1980 births
Hungarian footballers
Hungarian expatriate footballers
Association football defenders
Dunaújváros FC players
Lion City Sailors FC players
Hong Kong Rangers FC players
FC Tatabánya players
Hong Kong FC players
1. FC Pforzheim players
Shatin SA players
Stal Stalowa Wola players
Vác FC players
Singapore Premier League players
I liga players
Oberliga (football) players
Nemzeti Bajnokság II players
Nemzeti Bajnokság III players
Hong Kong First Division League players
Hong Kong Premier League players
Expatriate footballers in Singapore
Expatriate footballers in Germany
Expatriate footballers in Poland
Expatriate footballers in Hong Kong